Turn End is a grade II* listed garden and group of houses in Haddenham, Buckinghamshire, England.

History
The Turn End complex was designed by architect Peter Aldington and built largely by himself and his wife Margaret in the 1960s.  The group of three houses was awarded the Royal Institute of British Architects award for Architecture in 1970. In 1998, the houses were listed Grade II by English Heritage, adding to the numerous listed buildings in the village; the listing was upgraded to II* in 2006. Meantime, many small pieces of land had been added to the garden.

In 1999, a book about Turn End was published: A Garden and Three Houses by Jane Brown and Richard Bryant (Garden Art Press, ; republished in 2010 by Turn End Charitable Trust ).  In his foreword, Peter Shepheard says, "Today these houses and their gardens stand mature as a rare example of how to add modern houses to an ancient village without a hint of suburbia".

Complex
The Turn End complex includes,

 The Turn, Middle Turn and Turn End houses
 A stable originally housing two draught horses, and a dray 
 A converted Victorian house formerly containing the offices of the architectural practice
 A wychert cottage

The Aldingtons still live at Turn End, The Turn and the offices are leased, while Middle Turn is occupied by the second generation of the original owners.

Gardens
The Turn and Middle Turn have their own small private gardens. Turn End's garden, the properties other than Middle Turn and Turn End, and all witchert walls are managed from the above rentals by a garden manager, with Peter and Margaret Aldington. This income is supplemented by plant and other sales.

Turn End Trust
Turn End Trust, formerly Turn End Charitable Trust, is a registered charity that operates an educational programme comprising greater public access to both Turn End house and garden; garden workshops, walks and tours; architectural visits and talks.

References

Further reading
Aldington, Craig and Collinge: Twentieth Century Architects by Alan Powers. RIBA Publishing 2009. 
Houses created by Peter Aldington  RIBA Publishing 2016.

External links
 Turnend: a garden and three houses website

Grade II* listed houses in Buckinghamshire
Houses completed in 1967
Modernist architecture in England